The 2014 Slovnaft Cup Final was the final match of the 2013–14 Slovak Cup, the 45th season of the top cup competition in Slovak football. The match was played at the Stadium Myjava in Myjava on 1 May 2014 between ŠK Slovan Bratislava and MFK Košice. MFK Košice defeated Slovan Bratislava 2-1.

Route to the final

Match

Details

References

Slovak Cup Finals
Slovak Cup
Slovak Cup
Cup Final